Jitka Janáčková (born May 22, 1973 ın Mladá Boleslav) is a Czechoslovak-Czech sprint canoer who competed in the early to mid-1990s. At the 1992 Summer Olympics in Barcelona for Czechoslovakia, she was eliminated in the semifinals of both the K-2 500 m and the K-4 500 m events. Four years later in Atlanta for the Czech Republic, Janáčková was eliminated in the semifinals of both the K-2 500 m and the K-4 500 m events.

References
 Sports-Reference.com profile

1973 births
Canoeists at the 1992 Summer Olympics
Canoeists at the 1996 Summer Olympics
Czech female canoeists
Czechoslovak female canoeists
Living people
Olympic canoeists of Czechoslovakia
Olympic canoeists of the Czech Republic
Sportspeople from Mladá Boleslav